Vladimir Grig (born March 21, 1962 in  Krasnodar, USSR) is the pen name of Russian, St. Petersburg-based artist and musician Vladimir Grigorashchenko.

Biography

Art 

Born in Krasnodar in 1962, Vladimir Grig graduated from Krasnodar Art College in 1987. He started his career as an illustrator in publishing houses and was soon accepted into USSR Union of Artists in 1990. Vladimir's first exhibitions took place in Krasnodar in 1992 and Heidelberg, Germany in 1993, followed by exhibitions in Saint-Petersburg, Moscow, and Sochi, Russia, as well as exhibitions in exhibitions in Germany and Austria.

He took part in the 4th Biennale of Graphic Art in Krasnodar in 1994, the 4th International St.Petersburg Spatia Nova Biennale in 1996, Russian Days in Germany in 2003, the Baltic States Biennale of Graphic Art in 2008. Vladimir participated in numerous Moscow art fairs between 2004 and 2013. His art project entitled Dimensionen was exhibited as part of the 55th Venice Biennale parallel programme.

Vladimir Grig is best known for his science art installations at Dokuchaev Central Soil Science Museum in St. Petersburg in 2008 and 2009 and at the Winzavod Contemporary Art Centre in Moscow in 2011. His 2009 Underground Kingdom project in collaboration with Soil Museum and his installation at the Winzavod Centre during the Life: Science Version festival were created with support of Dmitry Zimin's Dynasty Foundation.

Grig's works are present in the collections of the State Russian Museum, Kovalenko Art Museum in Krasnodar, Dokuchaev Central Soil Science Museum, St. Petersburg PRO ARTE Foundation for Culture and Arts, Kaliningrad State Art Gallery, Krasnodar Central Exhibition Hall, Russian National Library and Universidad Michoacana de San Nicolás de Hidalgo in Mexico.

Music 
Vladimir performs as a vocalist and guitarist in an improvisation band Melonoise.

Awards 
Grig's works have been awarded in Russia and Germany.  In 1993 and 1999, he received Krasnodar art institutions' awards. In 1995, Nocturne Final III won him a scholarship of the Berlin Academy of Arts. His Underground Kingdom project received a Dynasty Foundation prize in 2009. Vladimir is also a 2011 Kuryokhin Prize and 2012 Kandinsky Prize nominee.

Style 
It is agreed upon that Vladimir Grig's individual style originates from the Soviet print design of the 1950s-1960s. Vladimir's manner of work is also considered relevant to Moscow Conceptualists of the 1970s.

Notable exhibitions 

 2019  COSMOSCOW artfair, Gridchinhall Gallery booth
 2018 Looking for a modern style, Russian Museum, Marble Palace, St. Petersburg.
 2017 Arrived, Gridchinhall gallery, Moscow  region 
 2017 Contemporary art fair SAM FAIR, Street art Museum, St. Petersburg.
 2012-2017 Participation in projects of St.Petersburg Improvisers Orchestra, St. Petersburg.     
 2017 Project «Heroic Cantata for crickets with orchestra-II", Dokuchaev Museum of Soil science St. Petersburg (together with the St. Petersburg improvisation Orchestra) 
 2016 Auction: PHILLIPS: NEW NOWLONDON AUCTION - 13 rooms 
 2016 Museum of contemporary art PERMM - Actual Drawing
 2015	“Who am I? Where am I?” Gridchinhall gallery, Moscow region.
 2014 Actual drawing. Russian Museum, Marble Palace,   St.Petersburg
 2014 Vladimir Grig to Samuel Beckett. Experimental sound gallery,   St.Petersburg
 2014 Russia is doing itself. VDNKh,   Moscow
 2014 Project Cantata heroic, Crickets with Orchestra, Soil science Museum,  St.Petersburg
 2013 Art Moscow 2013 
 2013  Biennale of graphics of the Baltic Sea Kaliningrad – Königsberg 2013
 2013 New Russian realism. Central House of Artist,  Moscow
 2013 Project Dimensionen – II. ALGallery,  St.Petersburg 
 2012 Project Disappearing. East gallery, Moscow
 2012 Exhibition of the Kandinsky Prize nominees. Udarnik movie theater, Moscow
 2012 Project Game, Exhibition of the Kuryokhin Prize nominees.  St.Petersburg
 2010 Project Game. East gallery,   Moscow
 2009 Project Transition. East gallery,   Moscow
 2009 Project Underworld. Soil science Museum, St.Petersburg
 2008 Project Strip cartoon. East gallery,  Moscow
 2006 Project Absolute happiness 60s.   Moscow

Notes

Links 
 Works on Gridchinhall
 Works on Vimeo

20th-century Russian painters
Russian male painters
21st-century Russian painters
Painters from Saint Petersburg
Musicians from Saint Petersburg
21st-century Russian sculptors
20th-century Russian sculptors
20th-century Russian male artists
Russian male sculptors
1962 births
Living people
21st-century Russian male artists
People from Krasnodar